Bufuka Village lies on the eastern coast of Lake Bunyonyi, in Kitumba sub-county seven kilometres out of Kabale town, southwestern Uganda. It is a village of 350 people and has three islands under its jurisdiction.

Bufuka has been severely hit by AIDS. The reason for the outbreak was a Uganda Railway's official from Bufuka who took many men to work in the capital, and they brought back the disease. Today, the village is chiefly populated by older women and orphans.

Being the closest place to the town, the area got the first tourist hotel already in the 1960s. Today the building is a ruin but there are five other operating tourist sites at Bufuka. The trading centre called Rutindo is the site of the bi-weekly market.

The main part of the village is a peninsula where a Protestant church now lies. Bufuka Primary School was an outshoot of the church starting in 1938.

Populated places in Uganda